The University Teachers Association of Ghana (UTAG) called on its members to engage in an indefinite strike on January 10, 2022. The UTAG stated that this action is due to "worsening conditions of service" without sufficient response from the employer.

References 

Education strikes
Labor disputes in Ghana
2022 labor disputes and strikes
2022 in Ghana
Education in Ghana